Emamzadeh Abu Taleb Rural District is in the Central District of Robat Karim County, Tehran province, Iran. At the National Census of 2006, its population was 4,921 in 1,251 households. There were 4,985 inhabitants in 1,363 households at the following census of 2011. At the most recent census of 2016, the population of the rural district was 4,912 in 1,395 households. The largest of its three villages was Adaran, with 2,322 people.

References 

Robat Karim County

Rural Districts of Tehran Province

Populated places in Tehran Province

Populated places in Robat Karim County